Bella Galárraga (born January 26, 1993) is a Portuguese-Ecuadorian and Argentinian model, engineer, environmental, television presenter and beauty pageant titleholder. She was crowned Miss Portugal 2010 and competed in Miss Universe 2010. On January 22, 2012, she won the Miss Elite Model Detroit/ Ecuador pageant. She also is the first Miss Portugal to win the title of Miss European Continent 2016, held in Murcia, Spain.

Biography
Born and raised in Quito she is the daughter of a Portuguese mother and an Ecuadorian father with roots of grandparents from “La Rioja” Argentina. Galárraga is a polyglot, speaks Portuguese, and perfectly Spanish, English, and studies Russian. In 2009 he traveled to Portugal to continue his university studies; since February 2013, he is a Systems Engineer and Marketing management, graduated from the ESPE University Escuela Politécnica del Ejército of Ecuador. She is a professional model since she was 16 years old and has Portuguese nationality since 2005 & Maldivian since 2015 nationality from The Maldives.
In May 2013 she makes her debut as a television presenter in the program "Petrovida" The Ecuadorian state oil company Petroecuador a television program in favor of the environment, obtaining good criticism by the public.
Galárraga was also a model of the famous program "The Familion Nestlé" and directed by the Venezuelan presenter Daniel Sarcos broadcast by GamaTV.
In 2015, she was a reporter and presenter of sports television on a TV channel in Cuenca, Ecuador, reporting all about the Club Deportivo Cuenca of Ecuador.

Miss Universe Portugal 2010
Bella Galárraga Vargas at only 18 years, represented Oporto in Miss Portugal on April 11, 2010, competing with 13 other women in the country, was an exclusive event that took place in the multipurpose room “Coliseu dos Recreios de Lisbon” In this beauty pageant, Galarraga wins a special award  Best figure of Luso award for being the candidate with the best body of the pageant, and wins the most important beauty title of Portugal as the new Miss Universe Portugal 2010  Thus manages to win the right to represent Portugal in Miss Universe 2010, several rumors claimed that it was held in Zabreg - Croatia but finally it was in Las Vegas - United States the winner of Miss Universe 2010 was the Mexican Ximena Navarrete was the second crown from Mexico

Reina de Quito 2012
Galárraga has been always favorite of the press and public since she was a candidate for Queen of Quito in 2012. But although already had experience in beauty contests, finally, the November 22, 2012 (final date of the contest) don't was finalists.

References

 
 
 
 
 
 
 



1991 births
Living people
Portuguese beauty pageant winners
Portuguese female models
Portuguese television presenters
Portuguese women television presenters